Georges Delnon (born 20 March 1958) is a Swiss theatre director, artistic director and professor. From 2006 to 2015 he was the artistic director of the Theater Basel and he took over the management of the Hamburg State Opera in 2015.

Life
Delnon grew up in Bern.

His focus soon began to shift towards premieres of Musical theatres like 22.13 by Mark Andre (Munich Biennale, Festival d'Automne à Paris, Paris Opera); Hellhörig by Carola Bauckholt (Munich Biennale/Theater Basel), Der Alte vom Berge by Bernhard Lang (Schwetzingen Festival/Theater Basel); and 3 Frauen by Wolfgang Rihm (Theater Basel).
Additionally, he did many stagings in Europe, America and Asia, which were followed by his first movie productions.

As a professor, Delnon began at the Folkwang University of the Arts, moving on to working in Frankfurt, Montepulciano and Basel. In 2002 he received a professorship for scenic plays at the Hochschule für Musik Mainz. In the fall semester of 2014 he will be also working at the University of Zürich as a guest lecturer.

As an artistic director Delnon's career began at the Theater Koblenz (1996–1999), followed by the Staatstheater Mainz (until 2006) and the Theater Basel (until 2015), where he won the award Opera house of the year two times in a row (2009/2010). From 2009 to 2016 he was the artistic director of the Schwetzingen Festival. Since 2015 he has been artistic director (Intendant) of the Hamburg State Opera and the Hamburg Philharmonic State Orchestra.

Awards and honors
2003 he was named honorary Professor of the University of Mainz and received the Order of Merit of Rhineland-Palatinate. Since 2002 Delnon is a member of the Deutsche Akademie der Darstellenden Künste.

Stagings (selection)

 Carmen and Die Fledermaus for Frankfurt Opera
 Dido in Toulouse
 The Rape of Lucretia for Deutsche Oper am Rhein, Düsseldorf, and for Theater Basel
 Traviata, Butterfly and Liebe zu den drei Orangen in Dortmund
 Fräulein Julie (Miss Julie) in Essen
 La Griselda (Vivaldi) in Geneva
 Der junge Lord (Henze), Maria Stuart and Ezio (Händel-Festspiele Karlsruhe)
 Parsifal, Jenufa and Medea in Saarbrücken at the Saarländisches Staatstheater
 Schwarze Spinne (Sutermeister), Das Lachen der Schafe (Demierre) and König für einen Tag (Grünauer) in Lucerne
 Hoffmanns Erzählungen in Hanover
 Carmen, Lulu, Saul, the premiere of G by G. Bryars and Don Giovanni in Mainz
 Ubu Rex for the Teatro Colón in Buenos Aires
 Juditha triumphans by Antonio Vivaldi for the festival at Kammeroper Schloss Rheinsberg
 the premiere of 22,13 by Mark Andre for the Munich Biennale, Mainz and the Festival d'Automne à Paris/Paris Opera
 Il figlio delle selve, the premiere of Fredrik Zeller's Zaubern and Proserpina by Krauss at the Schwetzingen Festival
 Hellhörig (premiere) by Carola Bauckholt for the Munich Biennale
 Drei Frauen (premiere) by Wolfgang Rihm at the Theater Basel

Filmography
 As director
 Aida am Rhein for the Schweizer Fernsehen and 3sat (2010)
 Re:igen, Musikfilm Coproduction ZKM/Südwestrundfunk (2014)
 As actor
 in Edgar Reitz's film version of Heimat (2004)
 in the Hunkeler crime thriller Hunkeler und die Augen des Ödipus, SRF (2012)

Writings
 A contribution in Elke Heidenreich's book Ein Traum von Musik

References

External links
 Faz.de
 Badische-zeitung.de
 Tageswoche.ch
 Basellandschaftlichezeitung.ch

1958 births
Living people
Film people from Zürich
People from Bern
University of Bern alumni
Swiss theatre directors
University of Fribourg alumni
Swiss opera directors